Cho Chung-Yun was a South Korean association football player and manager. He was president of Korea Football Association.

Honours

Manager
Hyundai FC
 Professional Football Championship: 1986

References

1946 births
Living people
Association football midfielders
South Korean footballers
Ulsan Hyundai FC managers
Korea University alumni
South Korean football executives
South Korean football managers
Pungyang Jo clan